The Mallos de Riglos (English: Mallets of Riglos) are a set of conglomerate rock formations, located in the municipality of Las Peñas de Riglos, in the Hoya de Huesca comarca, in Aragon, Spain. They are located near Las Peñas de Riglos some 45 km (28 mi) to the northwest of the city of Huesca.

The Mallos were formed when eroded material washed down from the slopes of the Pyrenees and became cemented together by limestone. Over time, this mixture became compacted into a large mass of conglomerate rock. Eventually, erosion wore away the softer, more porous parts of the conglomerate. The more resistant rock remained, and became the formations known as the Mallos de Riglos.

Because of their relatively vertical sides, the Mallos de Riglos are a popular destination for climbers.

Gallery

References

External links

 Visitor information from InfoAragón
 Satellite view of the Mallos de Riglos from Google Maps
 Rock-climbing guide to Riglos
 Illustrated article on climbing at Riglos

Landforms of Aragon
Rock formations of Spain
Climbing areas of Spain